The Alexis LaTour House also known as, Old Homeplace and Guillory Homeplace was an historic house in Ville Platte, Louisiana. The oldest portion of the house was built in 1835 by Alexis LaTour. The house was expanded in 1837. The original house was a -story Creole cottage of bousillage construction that was one room wide and two rooms deep and had a front gallery. The 1837 expansion added two rooms and a central hall. Details of the house, including an exterior staircase, bousillage construction, and beaded clapboarding, ceiling beams, and ceiling boards were common in traditional Creole architecture. Both the older and the newer part of the house had unusual mantels. The older mantel featured cove moldings, panels, and a large central lozenge. The other mantels in the house were more traditional but were still unusual.

In 1900 several modifications were made including the addition of Queen Anne style dormer windows and a large rear wing. Over time, other, smaller modifications have been made including the replacement of windows and doors, the replacement of the original gallery columns, and the replacement of front, exterior staircase. Despite the modifications, the house still retained significant integrity, including the basic Creole form of the house, the bousillage construction, the copious beading, and the original mantels at the time of its enlistment in the National Register of Historic Places. The house was the best detailed and largest surviving early structure in Evangeline Parish.

The house was listed on the National Register of Historic Places on September 14, 1987, for its architectural significance. The house is still standing in Saint Landry Parish at 890 Chretien Point Road, Sunset.

See also
National Register of Historic Places listings in Evangeline Parish, Louisiana

References

Houses completed in 1835
Creole architecture in Louisiana
Houses on the National Register of Historic Places in Louisiana
Houses in Evangeline Parish, Louisiana
National Register of Historic Places in Evangeline Parish, Louisiana